"Yeah" is a song recorded by American country music artist Joe Nichols. It was released in January 2014 as his second single for Red Bow Records and from his eighth studio album Crickets (2013). The song, written by Ashley Gorley and Bryan Simpson, is about a man having a one night stand in the summer with a woman.

"Yeah" gave Nichols his fifth number-one hit on the Billboard Country Airplay chart and his second top 10 hit on the Hot Country Songs chart at number 7. It also charted outside the Hot 100, peaking at number 41. The song was certified Gold by the Recording Industry Association of America (RIAA), and has sold 612,000 units in the United States as of September 2014. It achieved similar chart success in Canada, giving Nichols his second number-one hit on the Country chart and number 48 on the Canadian Hot 100.

An accompanying music video for the song was directed by Wes Edwards.

Content
The song is a mid-tempo about a man experiencing a summer night with a woman. Throughout, he responds to various situations with the word "Yeah".

Reception

Critical
Giving it a "B", Tammy Ragusa of Country Weekly praised the production: "there's something about that opening riff and midtempo, thumping groove that hints toward all of the warm-weather goodness that the impending summer holds—without being an in-your-face bikinis, babes and brews blaster." She also praised the "warmth" of Nichols' voice.

Commercial
"Yeah" debuted at number 59 on the U.S. Billboard Country Airplay chart for the week of January 25, 2014, at number 44 on the U.S. Billboard Hot Country Songs chart for the week of March 1, 2014, and at  number 98 on the U.S. Billboard Hot 100 chart for the week of May 10, 2014. The song was certified Gold by the RIAA on July 29, 2014. As of September 2014, It had sold 612,000 copies in the U.S.

The song also debuted at number 48 on the Canadian Hot 100 chart for the week of June 21, 2014.

Music video
The music video was directed by Wes Edwards and premiered in May 2014.

Charts and certifications

Weekly charts

Year-end charts

Certifications

References

2013 songs
2014 singles
Joe Nichols songs
BBR Music Group singles
Music videos directed by Wes Edwards
Song recordings produced by Tony Brown (record producer)
Songs written by Ashley Gorley
Songs written by Bryan Simpson